Yevdokimova is a rural locality (a village) in Leninskoye Rural Settlement, Kudymkarsky District, Perm Krai, Russia. The population was 23 as of 2010.

Geography 
Yevdokimova is located 36 km south of Kudymkar (the district's administrative centre) by road. Chaverina is the nearest rural locality.

References 

Rural localities in Kudymkarsky District